is a Japanese football player.

Club statistics

References

External links

1983 births
Living people
Shizuoka Sangyo University alumni
Association football people from Shizuoka Prefecture
Japanese footballers
J1 League players
Japan Football League players
Júbilo Iwata players
Ventforet Kofu players
Sagan Tosu players
Azul Claro Numazu players
Association football defenders